Rhino Peak is a  mountain summit located in the Boundary Ranges of the Coast Mountains, in the U.S. state of Alaska. Rhino Peak is set at the head of Mendenhall Glacier. This peak's descriptive name was published in 1960 by the U.S. Geological Survey.

Climate

Based on the Köppen climate classification, Rhino Peak is located in a subarctic climate zone, with long, cold, snowy winters, and cool summers. Weather systems coming off the Gulf of Alaska are forced upwards by the Coast Mountains (orographic lift), causing heavy precipitation in the form of rainfall and snowfall. Temperatures can drop below −20 °C with wind chill factors below −30 °C. The month of July offers the most favorable weather to view or climb Rhino Peak.

See also

Geospatial summary of the High Peaks/Summits of the Juneau Icefield
Geography of Alaska

References

External links
 Rhino Peak weather forecast
 Photo of Rhino Peak in lower right corner 
 Rhino Peak Flickr photo
            

Mountains of Alaska
Mountains of Juneau, Alaska
Boundary Ranges
North American 1000 m summits